Richard Maru, OBE is a Papua New Guinea politician. He is a Member of the National Parliament of Papua New Guinea representing Yangoru Saussia Open, and is the leader of People’s First Party. He was appointed as Minister for International Trade and Investment in 2022.

In 2011, he was appointed an OBE for services to development banking and rural development, and an active member of the Association of Development Financing Institutions in Asia and the Pacific.

Early life 
Maru graduated from the Papua New Guinea University of Technology in 1983 with a Bachelor of Technology in Business Studies Degree. He completed an MBA from the University of Bath in 1999.

Political career 
Maru was first elected to the National Parliament in the 2012 election as an independent candidate. He was then appointed as Minister for Trade, Commerce and Industry in the O'Neill-Dion cabinet.

He was re-elected in the 2017 election, representing People's National Congress. He was then appointed Minister for National Planning and Monitoring.

He was appointed as Minister for Finance and Rural Development on 13 May 2019 until 7 June 2019.

As of 2022, he is the leader of the People’s First Party.

References

Members of the National Parliament of Papua New Guinea
National Alliance Party (Papua New Guinea) politicians
Ministers of Finance of Papua New Guinea
Living people
Year of birth missing (living people)
People's National Congress (Papua New Guinea) politicians